Attock Petroleum Limited (APL) is Pakistani oil marketing company which is a subsidiary of the UK-domiciled company Attock Oil Company. It is based in Rawalpindi, Pakistan.

History
It started its operations in 1998 and is third largest oil marketing company in Pakistan as of 2018.

In 2005, it was listed on the Pakistan Stock Exchange.

It has filling stations in Federal Capital Territory, Khyber Pukhtunkwa, Kashmir, Gilgit Baltistan, Balochistan, Punjab and Sindh. It also provides CNG at selected stations. Other facilities include tire shop, mosques, and resting areas.

The company also opened two filling stations in Jalalabad, making it the first Pakistani oil marketing company in Afghanistan.

Company products
 Furnace oil
 High speed diesel oil
 Light speed diesel oil
 Premier motor gasoline
 Kerosene oil
 Road paving asphalt
 Lubricants

See also
 Attock Refinery

References

External links

 

Oil and gas companies of Pakistan
Companies based in Rawalpindi
Energy companies established in 1998
Non-renewable resource companies established in 1998
Pakistani companies established in 1998
Companies listed on the Pakistan Stock Exchange
Pakistani subsidiaries of foreign companies
Automotive fuel retailers